Schizopepon is a genus of flowering plants belonging to the family Cucurbitaceae.

Its native range is Eastern Himalaya to Russian Far East and Japan.

Species:

Schizopepon bicirrhosus 
Schizopepon bomiensis 
Schizopepon bryoniifolius 
Schizopepon dioicus 
Schizopepon longipes 
Schizopepon macranthus 
Schizopepon monoicus 
Schizopepon xizangensis

References

Cucurbitaceae
Cucurbitaceae genera